The canton of Le Haut-Grésivaudan is an administrative division of the Isère department, eastern France. It was created at the French canton reorganisation which came into effect in March 2015. Its seat is in Pontcharra.

It consists of the following communes:
 
Les Adrets
Allevard
Barraux
La Buissière
Le Champ-près-Froges
Chapareillan
La Chapelle-du-Bard
Le Cheylas
Crêts-en-Belledonne
La Flachère
Froges
Goncelin
Le Haut-Bréda
Hurtières
Le Moutaret
La Pierre
Pontcharra
Sainte-Marie-d'Alloix
Sainte-Marie-du-Mont
Saint-Maximin
Saint-Vincent-de-Mercuze
Tencin
Theys
Le Touvet

References

Cantons of Isère